"Sadbird" is the second television play episode of the third season of the American television series CBS Playhouse. The episode was a coming-of-age drama about a young man finding his own in the toy business after years of rejecting the corporate lifestyle.

"Sadbird" aired in December 1969, was nominated for an Emmy award for writer George Bellak, and starred such noteworthy actors and actresses as Ed Asner, Tyne Daly, and Jack Albertson.

References

External links 
 

1969 American television episodes
1969 plays
CBS Playhouse episodes